The Federation of International Pitch and Putt Associations (FIPPA) is one of the governing bodies for the pitch and putt in the world, along with the International Pitch and Putt Association (IPPA). It was created in March 2006 by the representatives of 17 national governing bodies and is based in Barcelona, Catalonia.

Members include the pitch and putt unions of Ireland, Great Britain, Catalonia, The Netherlands, Norway, Switzerland, Australia, Chile, Andorra, Germany and the United States. Canada and China are associated members.

FIPPA organizes a World Cup since 2004 and a World Strokeplay Championship since 2009.

In 2009, France, Italy, San Marino and Denmark left FIPPA, after the creation of another international association, the International Pitch and Putt Association (IPPA).

Notes and references

See also
Pitch and Putt World Cup
World Strokeplay Championship

External links 
International Pitch and Putt Federation

Pitch and putt
International sports organizations